Gregory Benson is an American comedian, actor, and director. His production company, Mediocre Films, creates comedic short films, generally for YouTube. He is a frequent director for The Guild.

History 

Benson graduated from W. T. White High School in 1986. Eventually he moved to California, where he has since appeared in several television commercials. Benson is a sometime member of the ACME Comedy Theatre improv troupe in Hollywood, where he first worked with writer/actor Wil Wheaton, who has since appeared in a variety of Benson's projects.

He started making videos in 2005, initially hosting them on his own Mediocre Films website. Eventually he moved his distribution from his own site to YouTube, where within one month, "Greg Hits Hollywood", one of his shorts, was featured on the site's home page. The video and its sequels feature Benson interviewing strangers as a pretext for hitting them with his microphone to see "what people will put up with just because they want to be on TV, or even just YouTube." Since then, he has become a popular YouTube comedian, number 47 on the list of most subscribed comedians on YouTube. His most popular video as of early 2009 was episode 1 of the Gorgeous Tiny Chicken Machine Show, which was selected to be featured on YouTube shortly after being posted February 25, 2007, and subsequently drew nearly 2 million viewers. The series later was picked up by Sony Pictures, who continued the show through two seasons on YouTube as part of its "C Spot" lineup; one reviewer for The Times of London described it as "Pee-Wee Herman meets Monty Python via the hyperkinetic madness of Japanese television."

Benson's most prominent directing credit is his work on the Internet series The Guild, on which he worked again with his wife, Kim Evey, producer of The Guild,  as well as creator and performer of the Gorgeous Tiny Chicken Machine Show.
He also portrayed one of the passengers on the short Docudrama "The Flight that Fought Back". He and his wife, Kim, adopted a baby boy named Charlie in January 2016.

Awards 

His first video, "Coming Home", was chosen by Amazon.com customers as one of the top five videos of the Amazon/Tribeca Film Festival's short films division.

His short "Phone Call to God" was chosen for second place in the best comedy division at the 2006 Evil City Film Fest.

"The Guild", which Benson Directed the second half of season 1, has won several awards including 2007 YouTube Awards (Best Series), 2009 Streamy Awards (Best Series, Best Comedy Series), 2012 IAWTV Awards (Best Comedy Web Series)

Retarded Policeman 

Retarded Policeman is an American YouTube comedy web series written, directed, and edited by Benson, and based on an idea by his wife, producer and performer, Kim Evey. Scott Perry, Josh "The Ponceman" Perry's brother, has worked on the series.

The videos are uploaded on YouTube under the channel MediocreFilms.

Synopsis 
The fictional series follows learning impaired Officer Ponce (Josh "The Ponceman" Perry) as he pulls over members of the public.

Theme song 
The following is the lyrics to the 8 second long theme song played at the start of the video. Episode 15 had a rock remix of the theme song performed by Dave Days.

He is a cop,

And he's learning impaired,

He's the retarded policeman! (that's me!)

Episode list

References

External links 

American male comedians
21st-century American comedians
Film directors from Texas
Living people
Male actors from Dallas
Comedy YouTubers
Prank YouTubers
YouTubers from Texas
YouTube channels launched in 2006
Year of birth missing (living people)